Ruslan Oleksiyovych Nepeypiyev (born 3 June 2003) is a Ukrainian professional footballer who plays as a striker for Rukh Lviv.

Career

Early years
Born in Banyliv Pidhirnyi, Nepeypiyev began his career in the neighbouring Storozhynets youth sportive school, where his first trainer was Vasyl Heshko and then continued in the Bukovyna Chernivtsi and the UFK-Karpaty Lviv youth sportive school systems.

Rukh Lviv
In September 2020 he signed a contract with the Ukrainian Premier League side Rukh Lviv, but only played in the Ukrainian Premier League Reserves and made his debut in the Ukrainian Premier League as a second half-time substuituted player in an away losing match against Kolos Kovalivka on 28 August 2022.

References

External links
 
 

2003 births
Living people
Sportspeople from Chernivtsi Oblast
Ukrainian footballers
Ukraine youth international footballers
Association football forwards
FC Rukh Lviv players
Ukrainian Premier League players